Andrey Mikhaylovich Antropov (born 21 May 1967) is a badminton player from Russia who represented the Soviet Union and Russian Federation at the European Badminton Championships and the Unified Team and Russia at the 1992 and 1996 Olympics, respectively.

Antropov competed in badminton at the 1996 Summer Olympics in men's doubles with partner Nikolai Zuyev. They were defeated by Antonius Ariantho and Denny Kantono of Indonesia (15-5, 15-1) in the quarterfinals. Antropov earned the silver medal in the men's doubles with Zuyev at the 14th European Badminton Championships in Den Bosch, Netherlands, 10–17 April 1994. He also competed in men's singles at the 1992 and 1996 Olympics.

Achievements

World Cup 
Men's doubles

European Championships 
Men's singles

Men's doubles

European Junior Championships 
Mixed doubles

IBF World Grand Prix 
The World Badminton Grand Prix sanctioned by International Badminton Federation (IBF) since 1983.

Men's singles

Men's doubles

IBF International 
Men's singles

Men's doubles

Mixed doubles

References

External links

 
 
 

1967 births
Living people
Sportspeople from Omsk
Russian male badminton players
Badminton players at the 1992 Summer Olympics
Olympic badminton players of the Unified Team
Badminton players at the 1996 Summer Olympics
Olympic badminton players of Russia